Etonam Nicole Anyomi (born 10 February 2000) is a German footballer who plays as a forward for Frauen-Bundesliga club Eintracht Frankfurt and the Germany national team.

Club career
In January 2020, she extended her contract with SGS Essen.

In 2021, she signed with Eintracht Frankfurt.

International career
Anyomi made her international debut for Germany on 21 February 2021, coming on as a substitute in the 61st minute for Klara Bühl in a friendly match against Belgium. The home match finished as a 2–0 win for Germany.

Anyomi was named in the Germany squad for UEFA European Championship 2022. She scored her first international goal on 16 July 2022, in Germany's 4–0 group stage win over Finland.

Personal life
Anyomi was born in Krefeld to a Togolese father and a Ghanaian mother.

Career statistics

Scores and results list Germany's goal tally first, score column indicates score after each Anyomi goal.

Honours
Germany

 UEFA European Championship runner-up: 2022

References

External links
 
 
 
 

2000 births
Living people
Sportspeople from Krefeld
Footballers from North Rhine-Westphalia
German women's footballers
SGS Essen players
Frauen-Bundesliga players
Germany women's youth international footballers
Germany women's international footballers
German sportspeople of African descent
German people of Togolese descent
German sportspeople of Ghanaian descent
UEFA Women's Euro 2022 players
Eintracht Frankfurt (women) players

Association football forwards
Women's association football forwards